Anuchina is an uninhabited island in the Habomai Islands sub-group of the Kuril Islands chain in the south of the Sea of Okhotsk, northwest Pacific Ocean. Named after Dmitry Anuchin, Russian anthropologist, ethnographist and archaeologist. Island's Japanese name is derived from the Ainu language.

History
Anuchina was originally uninhabited. In 1799, under the Tokugawa shogunate of Japan, a trading post and settlement was established on the island by the villages of Akkeshi and Nemuro as a base for fishermen, and for trade with the Ainu, the native peoples of the Kurils, Sakhalin and Hokkaidō. Administration of the island came under the village of Habomai in Hokkaido during the Meiji period. The inhabitants of the island were mostly engaged in commercial fishing for Pollock and harvesting konbu.

During the Invasion of the Kuril Islands by the Soviet Union after the end of World War II, the island was seized without resistance. In 1945, its native inhabitants were deported to Hokkaido and the island was uninhabited except for Soviet Border Troops until they were withdrawn upon the dissolution of the Soviet Union in 1991. The island is now uninhabited and is administered as part of the Sakhalin Oblast of the Russian Federation.

See also
 Kuril Islands dispute

Notes

Further reading
 Krasheninnikov, Stepan Petrovich, and James Greive. The History of Kamtschatka and the Kurilski Islands, with the Countries Adjacent. Chicago: Quadrangle Books, 1963.
 Rees, David. The Soviet Seizure of the Kuriles. New York: Praeger, 1985. 

Southern Kuriles